The 2nd Marine Expeditionary Brigade is a brigade of the United States Marine Corps. It is part of II Marine Expeditionary Force (II MEF). It advertises itself as a "middleweight" crises response force of choice in the European and Southern Command Areas of Operation. It is able to "operate independently, as a service component, or to lead a Joint Task Force".  Self-sufficient and interoperable, the 2nd Marine Expeditionary Brigade possesses a mix of command and control, combat power and specialized logistics. Operating as part of the greater Marine Corps team and with support from the United States Navy and other services, it can provide operational reach.

Current subordinate units
Headquarters element: 5th Battalion 10th Marines
Ground combat element: Regimental Combat Team 8
Aviation combat element: Marine Aircraft Group 40
Logistics combat element: Combat Logistics Regiment 2
2nd Civil Affairs Group

History
In 1991 the 2nd MEB made the first test of the Norway Air-Landed Marine Expeditionary Brigade (NALMEB), comprised completely of Marine Corps Reserve units as Operation Desert Storm was getting under way. The exercise was designated Battle Griffin and took place in February–March 1991. The force comprised HQ Company 25th Marines, 3/25 Marines, Co E, 4th Reconnaissance Battalion, and 1/14 Marine Artillery (Batteries HQ, Alpha, and Bravo).

Iraq war
The 2nd MEB became Task Force Tarawa, commanded by Brigadier General Richard F. Natonski, for Operation Iraqi Freedom, and, as TF Tarawa, was thus part of the 2003 invasion of Iraq under I Marine Expeditionary Force.  During the invasion 2nd MEB fought the Battle of Nasiriyah.

War in Afghanistan

It became Task Force Leatherneck, commanded by BGen Lawrence Nicholson during the 2009–10 deployment to Afghanistan for NATO's International Security Assistance Force (ISAF). In 2010, Task Force Leatherneck spearheaded both the Operation Strike of the Sword and the Battle of Marjah, the largest battles since the start of the Afghanistan Campaign. 

The 2nd MEB Command Element was reactivated on 20 Nov 2012 at Camp Lejune, North Carolina. The reactivated unit is designed to be a "scalable, standing, joint-capable, and a deployment-ready headquarters element that can also enable the introduction of follow-on forces if required."

See also
Marine Expeditionary Unit

References

External links
 2nd Marine Expeditionary Brigade Official Website
 2d Marine Expeditionary Brigade at GlobalSecurity.org
 DVIDS website for the Special Purpose MAGTF - Afghanistan

Brigades of the United States Marine Corps
Units and formations of the United States in the War in Afghanistan (2001–2021)